Canción de Juventud (Song of Youth) is a 1962 Spanish language musical directed by Luis Lucia comedy film starring Rocío Dúrcal, also stars Helga Liné & Carlos Estrada.

Plot
Rocio is an orphan girl who is in a finishing school. She has fun teasing the boys from the neighboring school as she tries to fix a church. They found out the needed a large amount of money and the children decide to put on a talent show. Rocio is sad that her father won't come to the talent show, as he left her 5 years ago, so her friends try to reunite father & daughter for the talent show.

Track list
 "Volver a verte"
 "La niña buena"
 "La reunión"
 "La luna se ha vuelto loca"
 "Canción de juventud"
 "Quisiera ser un ángel"
 "Paraba papá"
 "La hormiguita"

External links
IMDb entry

Spanish musical comedy films
1962 films
Films directed by Luis Lucia
1960s Spanish-language films
1962 musical films
1962 soundtrack albums
Musical film soundtracks
Spanish-language albums
Rocío Dúrcal albums
Films scored by Augusto Algueró
1960s Spanish films